Mie koclok (lit: "shaked noodle"), is an Indonesian chicken noodle soup, a specialty of Cirebon city, West Java. The noodles come with a white-colored extra-thick porridge-like soup, made of chicken broth and coconut milk soup, which is coagulated with corn starch or tapioca. Other ingredients include shredded chicken breast, cabbage, bean sprouts, hard boiled egg, kaffir lime juice, and sprinkled with sliced fresh celery, spring onion, and fried shallot.

In Cirebonese dialect the term koclok means "shake", it refers to the method of softening and cooking the noodle by shaking the noodle placed in handled porous tin container, while being simmered in hot water. The dish commonly uses thick yellow egg noodle, but some might add bihun (rice vermicelli).

To add taste, spiciness and texture, kecap manis (sweet soy sauce), sambal and emping crackers might be added. A similar-named but slightly different beef-based noodle dish from neighboring city of Bandung is called mie kocok.

See also

Mie ayam
Mie celor
Mie kocok
Javanese cuisine
Sundanese cuisine
Noodle soup

References

External links
 Mie koclok Cirebon
 Mie koclok recipe
 Mie koclok recipe
 Mie koclok in Cirebon

Foods containing coconut
Noodle soups
Indonesian noodle dishes